Doncols is a village in the commune of Winseler, in north-western Luxembourg.

Population

, the village has a population of 221.

Historical and linguistic backgrounds

Doncols is known as an historically Walloon-speaking village, similarly to Sonlez.   A. Atten's 'Li leu d' Doncô' is considered the sole instance of a Walloon language text to have been written by a Grand Ducal national. (See the 'External link', below.)

Even by Luxembourg's trilingual standards, the village is noted for the number of different spellings of its name in various languages. Doncols is its spelling in French, Donkols in German, Donkels in Luxembourgish, and Doncô in Walloon.

See also

 Sonlez#Linguistic features

External links
http://rifondou.walon.org/leu.html#doncoo

Villages in Luxembourg
Wiltz (canton)